Marketplace Mall may refer to one of the following shopping malls in the United States:

Marketplace Mall (Winston-Salem), North Carolina
The Marketplace Mall, near Rochester, New York
Market Place Mall, in Champaign, Illinois